Government procurement or public procurement is the procurement of goods, services and works on behalf of a public authority, such as a government agency. Amounting to 12 percent of global GDP in 2018, government procurement accounts for a substantial part of the global economy.

To prevent fraud, waste, corruption, or local protectionism, the laws of most countries regulate government procurement to some extent. Laws usually require the procuring authority to issue public tenders if the value of the procurement exceeds a certain threshold. Government procurement is also the subject of the Agreement on Government Procurement (GPA), a plurilateral international treaty under the auspices of the WTO.

Overview

Need for government procurement 
Government procurement is necessary because governments cannot produce all the inputs for the goods they provide themselves. Governments usually provide public goods, e.g. national defense or public infrastructure. Public goods are non-rival and non-excludable, which means that one individual's consumption does not diminish the quantity or quality of the commodity available to others, and individuals cannot be prevented from freely consuming the commodity, or "free-riding". Consequently, private markets cannot provide public goods. Instead the government provides those goods and finances them by raising taxes from all citizens.

In addition to public goods, governments often also provide merit goods, such as education or health care. Merit goods are private goods which are rival and excludable and are therefore provided by private markets. Nevertheless, governments also provide merit goods because of reasons of equity and fairness and because they have positive externalities for society as a whole.

In order to provide public and merit goods, the government has to buy input factors from private companies, e.g. police cars, school buildings, uniforms etc. This process is called government or public procurement.

Problems 
Government procurement involves a high risk of corruption because of the great size of financial turnover and the complexity of many procurement processes in which businesses interact very closely with politicians and civil servants. Often the personal interests of the public officials are not the same as the interests of the public. The vulnerability of public buyers to private subversion has led every country to restrict the discretion of procuring entities in what they buy and pay.  But while the regulation of the private sector empowers public officials and enables them to extract bribes in exchange for regulatory relief, the regulation of government constrains public officials.  Public procurement regulations reduce the discretion of buyers, typically with the intent of reducing corruption.

Scope
Government procurement regulations normally cover all public works, services and supply contracts entered into by a public authority. However, there may be exceptions. These most notably cover military acquisitions, which account for large parts of government expenditures. The GPA and EU procurement law allow of exceptions where public tendering would violate a country's essential security interests. Additionally, certain politically or economically sensitive sectors, such as public health, energy supply or public transport, may also be treated differently.

Strategic purchasing in public procurement 
One of the consequences of the financial crisis of 2007–2008 was an attempt to reduce public spending in order to control public debt. This trend has affected government procurement for its significant share in public spending. Therefore, various purchasing strategies have been implemented to increase quality and to decrease cost of government procurement. These strategies include public e-procurement, centralized purchasing or framework agreements.

Public e-procurement 

Public e-procurement stands for replacing various phases of public procurement with electronic means. Purpose of using e-tools is reducing administrative costs by automation. E-procurement can also mitigate some barriers to entry for smaller suppliers, consequent increase of competition can reduce price of procurement.

Public procurement and innovation 
The large buying power of the public sector has led to the consideration of using public procurement as a stimulus to foster innovation. The activities of public procurement and innovation intersect in three specific areas: public procurement for innovation, public procurement of innovation, and innovative public procurement. First, multiple studies have established that public procurement for innovation is a viable and efficient tool to stimulate innovation as a demand - side tool in the innovation policy mix. Second, public procurement may also be used to innovate the public sector itself (public procurement of innovation), through the inclusion of "innovativeness" as a procurement goal (often as a secondary criterium). Third, novel procurement approaches (such as eProcurement or Public-Private Partnerships) may be introduced to innovate public procurement processes and entities.

Centralized purchasing in public procurement 
Centralized purchasing means awarding procurement contracts on behalf of one or more procuring entities. This method has been used to gain various benefits emerging from demand aggregation. Centralized procurement can be done by ordinary contracting authorities or established central purchasing body. Centralized procurement is regulated by local legislation. For instance, directives 2004/17/EC and 2004/18/EC are dealing with this issue in the EU. Commonly mentioned benefits of procurement centralization are as follows:

Final unit price decrease – Higher procurement value coming from demand aggregation can increase buyers bargaining power and decrease final price. Moreover, higher value can attract more companies to bid in the tender, increased competition might lead to better price as well.
Transaction costs reduction – Key objective of centralized procurement is preventing duplication of some procedures. Contracting units can reduce their transaction costs in cooperating with other entities. This aspect is often considered as most relevant argument for procurement centralization.
Knowledge sharing – Cooperation in purchasing can also result in sharing best procurement practices. Some central procurement bodies also perform research activities.

However, other centralization aspects are often criticized. Discussed drawbacks are often connected to the decentralization theorem stated by American economist Wallace E. Oates in 1972. The theorem claims that a decentralized system is more efficient, because of the information asymmetry between local and central government.

Procurement centralization might also negatively impact supply side. Higher procured values might require higher capacity of supplying company and it might create barrier to entry for small or medium companies. Consequently, it might lead to monopolizing public procurement market.

Critics also mention that only some goods can be purchased centrally. Goods that are heterogeneous or they have many characteristics are not suitable for this strategy.

Thresholds
Under many jurisdictions, there are certain thresholds in value which oblige procurers to publish tender details and information on contracts awarded and expenditure incurred, and to follow specific procurement procedures. Greater transparency and regulatory compliance are incurred at higher levels of expenditure. For example, the GPA applies to the letting of "any procurement contract with a value that reaches or exceeds the amounts (‘thresholds’) set in the Agreement".

Framework agreements 

Framework agreement is another method for aggregation of demand. It is a type of two-stage bid tendering procedure, that establishes incomplete contracts awards with one or more suppliers for given period of time.

The discussed advantage is an administrative costs reduction again as tender procedure don't have to be duplicated for agreed period of time. On the other hand, the term "Winner's curse" is associated with framework agreement as there is a price uncertainty in time.

All of these three procurement strategies are not mutually exclusive. So, framework agreements can be processed centrally through e-procurement.

Regulation by jurisdiction

Albania
Albania's Public Procurement Agency (Agjencia e Prokurimit Publik) is a central body with legal and public personality reporting to the Prime Minister, and financed by the State Budget. Its activity is based on: 
Law No. 9643/2006 "On public procurement", as amended
Law No. 125/2013 "On concessions and public private partnership", as amended, which repealed the previous law "On concessions" (Law No. 9663, dated 18 December 2006), and 
Law No. 9874/2008 "On public auction", as amended.
The main duties and competencies of the Public Procurement Agency are:
preparation of project-proposals for public procurement regulations, public auctions and those in the field of concessions/public private partnerships, preparation of Standard Tender Documents and issuing the necessary instructions in order to assist the contracting authorities undertaking these procedures;
verification of the implementation of public procurement, concessions and public auction procedures after the phase of contract signature and in case of infringements of the legal and sublegal provisions, penalizes with fines or proposes administrative measures;
monitoring the progress of the public procurement system, and the implementation of measures and activities in order to achieve and maintain a completely transparent and efficient system of concessions/public private partnerships;
preparation and publication of the Public Notices Bulletin;
exclusion of economic operators from participation in public procurement, concessions or public auctions for a period of 1 to 3 years;
promotion and organisation of training for central and local government officials involved in public procurement activities.

The Public Procurement Commission (PPC in English, KPP in Albanian) is a quasi-judicial state body with responsibility for providing legal protection in relation to public procurement.

The US Department of Commerce reports that businesses "occasionally complain about problems in the technical and financial criteria of contracts, resulting in biased and distorted competition" and that "improper implementation of [Albania's] public procurement procedures" has also been noted as a problem.

Albania has observer status with regard to the Government Procurement Agreement and is negotiating accession.

Algeria
Presidential Decree No. 10-236 of 7 October 2010, supplemented and amended by Presidential Decree No. 12-23 of 18 January 2012, regulates public procurement in Algeria.

American Samoa
The Office of Procurement, based in Tafuna, is the central authority on procurement for the American Samoa Government (ASG), being responsible for the procurement of all construction, goods, and services including the management, control, warehousing, and sale of stores/inventory commodities contained in its warehouse.

Angola
Public procurement in Angola is governed by Law No. 20/10 of 7 September 2010, the Public Procurement Law, and Law No. 2/2011 on
Public-Private Partnerships in Angola. The Public Procurement Law repealed Law No. 7/96 of 16 February 1996 and Decree No. 40/05 of 8 June 2005. Public expenditure, the provision of services, the leasing and acquisition of goods, and public works contracts regulated through the Public Procurement Law.

Argentina
Argentina has observer status with respect to the Government Procurement Agreement.

Australia

The Australian government's procurement activity is governed by the Commonwealth Procurement Rules and overseen by the Department of Finance. The rules were revised on 1 January 2018. States and territories also have their own procurement policies and legislation.

Bahrain
The Tender Board of the Kingdom of Bahrain, based in Manama, regulates procurement and undertakes procurement activity for the kingdom's public bodies. The Board was established in 2003 under the directives of His Majesty King Hamad bin Isa Al Khalifa.

Bahrain has observer status with respect to the Government Procurement Agreement.

Bangladesh
The Swiss Challenge system is utilised in Bangladesh to procure infrastructure development through public-private partnerships.

Belize
Belize is a member of CARICOM. Government procurement is subject to the Contractor-General Act, No. 6 of 1993, which received the Governor-General's assent on 5 January 1994. The Act provided for the establishment of the Office of the Contractor-General. The Contractor-General is an independent, non-political appointment made by the Governor-General acting on the recommendations of both Houses of the National Assembly.

Brazil
Government procurement in Brazil is regulated by a number of different laws with different procedures depending on the importance and the value of the procurement. The most important law about government procurement which contains basic rules of public procurements and administrative contracts was the Law nº 8.666, 21 June 1993, which contained rules for public tenders and for restricted tenders. This law was succeeded by the law Lei 14.133/21, 1st , April, 2021. There are different rules regulating procurement of public services, as Law nº 8.987, 13 February 1995 (Concession and Permission of Public Services); Law nº 12.462, 4 August 2011 (Differentiated Procurement – RDC in Portuguese) and Law nº 10.520, 17 July 2002, which deals with a reverse auction. In the internet field (e-procurement) there are executive orders (Decretos) which regulate public procurement, such as Decree nº 5.450, 31 May 2005 and Decree nº 7.982, 23 January 2013: the latter regulates procedures for specific situations of sharing acquisitions of goods or under portioned delivering.

Burkina Faso
Burkina Faso's Autorite de Regulation de la Commande Publique (ARCOP), established in July 2008, is the regulatory oversight body which ensures fairness in government procurement processes. Its role is to monitor the execution of all government contracts and it may impose sanctions, initiate lawsuits, and publish the names of fraudulent or delinquent businesses.

Decree N° 2003-269/PRES/PM/MEF of May 2003 on the general regulations governing public procurement instituted a new public contracts code which extended the scope of public contracting and provided for improvements in transparency in procurement procedures. Appeals from bidders regarding the contract award process are heard by a Standing Committee on the Amicable Settlement of Disputes (CRAL).

The US Department of State has noted that Burkina Faso did not  operate a "forced localization" policy and did not impose any "offset" requirements (i.e. stipulations which require that foreign suppliers invest in local production or service facilities in order to be awarded a contract).

Canada
Public procurement in Canada is regulated on various governmental levels (federal, provincial, municipal). Most federal procurement is organized by the Public Services and Procurement Canada (PSPC) agency and is governed by their Code of Conduct of Procurement in combination with principles laid out in the Federal Accountability Act and in the Financial Administration Act. Public procurement is guided by the principles of fairness, transparency, openness, and non-discrimination and complies with all international agreements that Canada is a member of (WTO Government Procurement Agreement [GPA], NAFTA, CETA, and various bilateral FTAs). Foreign suppliers from member nations to these agreements can bid on Canadian government procurements and are treated the same as domestic suppliers.

The principal statutory provisions regulating government procurement are:

Department of Public Works and Government Services Act (1996)
Financial Administration Act (1985) and the Government Contracts Regulations
Defence Production Act 1985 (consolidated version published 2011)
Federal Accountability Act, 2006

In general, bids must be solicited by the procuring department unless estimated expenditure does not exceed $25,000, or $100,000 "where the contract is for the acquisition of architectural, engineering and other services required in respect of the planning, design, preparation or supervision of the construction, repair, renovation or restoration of a work". For contracts above $25,000, tenders are published on the transparent Government Electronic Tendering Service (GETS). A non-competitive procurement process is only used in certain special circumstances. One such area of exception are security-related procurements. In that case the Defence Production Act applies, which allows using a special process and favouring domestic suppliers in acquiring defence supplies and conducting defence.

China
During the period from 1949 to 1978, Chinese public bodies acquired the goods and services they required in accordance with administratively directed transactions, whereas since the economic reforms of 1978, "central planning has started to give way to market forces". Researchers Ping Wang and Xinglin Zhang suggest that for comparative law purposes, it only makes sense to speak of "government procurement" or "public procurement" after the implementation of the 1978 reforms.

The "Government Procurement Law of the People's Republic of China", adopted at the 28th Meeting of the Standing Committee of the Ninth National People's Congress on 29 June 2002, is the primary legislation in China. The "Implementing Regulations of the Government Procurement Law", which supplement and clarify the Law, came into effect on 1 March 2015. Regulations on military procurement are formulated separately by the Central Military Commission (Article 86).

The finance departments within each section of government are responsible for the supervision of departmental public procurement (Article 13).

China has observer status with regard to the Government Procurement Agreement and is negotiating accession.

East Timor
The Ministry of Finance in East Timor or Timor-Leste is responsible for the oversight of government procurement. The Government uses the Timor-Leste eProcurement Portal for purchasing.

Equatorial Guinea
In Equatorial Guinea, the procurement system introduced when the country became independent from Spain in 1968 has been described by the World Bank as "obselete". In 2022 the World Bank proposed a draft law on public procurement and contracts which is intended to address some of the recognised weaknesses in the country's procedures and regulations.

Eritrea
The Government of the State of Eritrea received financing in 2020 from the African Development Bank to support a "Public Financial Management and Statistics Capacity Building Project". The government has stated that it intends to use part of this funding to appoint a consultant to draft a Public Procurement Law and related documents.

Ethiopia
Government procurement in Ethiopia is governed by the Ethiopian Federal Government Procurement and Property Administration Proclamation No.649/2009, which replaced the proclamation on Procedures of Public Procurement and Establishing its Supervisory Agency, Proclamation No. 430/2005. The Public Procurement
and Property Administration Agency advises the federal government on "all public procurement and property administration policies, principles and implementation" and provides "technical assistance to the regional governments and city administrations".

European Union

Government procurement in the European Union accounts for more than EUR 2.2 trillion, or 14% of the EU GDP. It has been regulated and harmonized by community law since the 1970s in order to guarantee transparency and non-discrimination of EU companies in government procurement in all member states. EU laws apply only to tenders that exceed certain thresholds in value. These thresholds vary depending on the area the contract is for and if the procurement is done by a central government or by other public authorities (e.g. municipal government). National laws are applied for tenders below these threshold values. Relevant EU Directives regarding government procurement currently in force are Directive 2009/81, Directive 2014/24, and Directive 2014/25.

There are five different procedures for public procurement:

Open procedure: any company is allowed to submit a tender
Restricted procedure: only companies that have been preselected are allowed to submit a tender
Negotiated procedure: there are direct negotiations with at least three companies
Competitive dialogue: if it is not possible to define technical specifications at the beginning, a competitive dialogue with at least three companies is started after which tenders can be submitted. This procedure is applied for complex procurements.
Electronic auctions: companies that pass a pre-evaluation process can bid in electronic auctions for public contracts

The EU Directive 2014/24 foresees two award criteria, namely the lowest price criterion or economically most advantageous offer criterion. In terms of contractual forms, the relationship between contracting authority and economic operator can be regulated by a public supply contract, framework agreement or dynamic purchasing system.

The European Commission is working on further improving efficiency and transparency in government procurement in the EU with its current public procurement strategy.

Austria
Government procurement in Austria is regulated by the Federal Procurement Act 2017.

Belgium
Belgian legislation on public procurement is set out in the Act of 17 June 2016 implementing the 2014 EU procurement directives. The Laws of 17 June 2016 on public procurement and on concession contracts, and the Law of 16 February 2017 on remedies, failed to meet the EU's transposition deadline (18 April 2016). Royal Decrees issued on 18 April 2017 for general public procurement, 18 June 2017 for procurement in the water, energy, transport and postal services sectors, 22 June 2017 containing new rules on the performance of public works contracts and concession contracts for public works and 25 June 2017, for the award and performance of concession contracts, have augmented the earlier laws.

Article 51 of the Royal Decree of 18 April 2017 includes a "revolving door mechanism", which targets the situation where a person previously working for a contracting authority is now being employed by an economic operator involved in a public procurement procedure established by that contracting authority. In this type of situation the person would be presumed to have a conflict of interest for a two-year period following the termination of his/her employment with the contracting authority.

Bulgaria
Government procurement in Bulgaria is a critical area in corruption risk. Public procurement contracts have been awarded to a handful of companies amid widespread irregularities, procedure violations and tailor-made selection or award criteria. The Bulgarian public procurement portal reported in September 2016 that since the beginning of 2016, "a total of 15,105 contracts were signed on the basis of public procurement orders". At the beginning of 2015, the Bulgarian government announced a 130-kilometer extension to the barbed wire border fence along its border with Turkey in order to completely secure the land border. Prime Minister Boyko Borisov described the extension as "absolutely necessary" in order to prevent persons from illegally entering the European Union member state. The Bulgarian Parliament authorised amendments to procurement legislation to allow continued construction of the fence without launching a public procurement procedure "because of the need to safeguard national security".

Croatia
The first public procurement law in Croatia based on the EU Procurement Directives was enacted in 2001, but a revised legal structure for public procurement was put in place with the Public Procurement Act of 2012, and this was superseded by the Public Procurement Act of 2016, effective 1 January 2017. Public-private partnerships (PPPs) are governed by the Act on Public-Private Partnerships. Two key Croatian institutions are the Public Procurement Office and the Public Procurement Supervisory Commission, established in 2001, now (since 2013) the State Commission for Supervision of Public Procurement (DKOM). The State Commission is an independent quasi-judicial body with nine members appointed by the Croatian Parliament for a five-year term and accountable to the Croatian Parliament for its work. The High Administrative Court of the Republic of Croatia has jurisdiction over the State Commission in relation to disputes concerning procedure, but there is no right of appeal against Commission decisions.

Under Croatian law, procurement procedures must be carried out by authorised representatives of the contracting authority, of whom at least one must hold a valid procurement certificate.

Cyprus
The Public Procurement Directorate of the Treasury of the Republic of Cyprus is responsible for procurement policy.

Czech Republic
Government procurement in the Czech Republic is regulated by Act No. 134/2016 Coll., on Public Contracts, signed by the President of the Republic on 22 April 2016.

In May 2015, Prime Minister Andrej Babiš was accused of alleged financial irregularities, and accusations from members of the public and from the opposition that he had promoted his own companies relation to government procurement opportunities triggered a vote of no confidence against Bohuslav Sobotka's government, called by the opposition parties ODS, TOP 09, and Dawn. The motion was defeated by 47–105.

Denmark
Economic operators who are dissatisfied with the conduct of public procurement activity in Denmark may complain to the Klagenævnet for Udbud (Public Procurement Complaints Board).

Estonia
The Estonian Ministry of Finance is responsible for public procurement policy, drafting the law, providing supervision and consultancy, and maintains a central Public Procurement Register. The current legislation is the Public Procurement Act of 2017, which came into effect on 1 September 2017, and which operates in conjunction with the Public Information Act of 2000, which regulates the publication of "information concerning public procurements which are being organised or have been organised by the state or local governments". Disputes are handled by the Public Procurements Appeal Committee.

Defence procurement for the Defence Forces, Ministry of Defence, Defence League, Defence Resources Agency and Estonian War Museum is organised by the Estonian Centre for Defence Investment, whose purpose is "to carry out procurement activities through ... professional-quality procurement and to use dedicated funds sparingly and prudently". The Centre for Defence Investment was established by the decree of the Minister of Defence on 9 November 2015 and became operational on 1 January 2017.

Finland
In Finland the following legislation applies to government procurement:
Act on Public Contracts and Concession Contracts (Act no. 1397 of 2016, effective 1 January 2017)
Act on Public Contracts by Contracting Authorities in the Water, Energy, Transport and Postal Services Sectors (Act no. 1398 of 2016, also known as the 'Act on public contracts in special sectors') 
Act on Public Contracts in the Fields of Defence and Security.

A Government Decree on Public Contracts was also in force until 2017.

The Ministry of Employment and the Economy is responsible for the preparation of legislation concerning public procurement. The Finnish Competition and Consumer Authority (FCCA) oversees public procurement: section 139 of the Act on Public Procurement and Concession Contracts mandates the FCCA to supervise compliance with public contracts legislation and to provide 'administrative guidance' or if necessary to issue a caution to a non-compliant public authority. The Market Court operates as a specialist court handling public procurement cases. The Market Court's rulings in public procurement cases can be appealed to the Supreme Administrative Court of Finland.

The Act on Electronic Auctions and Dynamic Purchasing Systems of 17 June 2011, which entered into force on 1 October 2011, introduced new procurement procedures, whereby documents relating to procurement would be sent and received exclusively online. This legislation included the use of eAuctions. Electronic procurement is now covered within the 2016 Act on Public Contracts.

Transposition of the 2014 EU public procurement directive into Finnish law was delayed after the deadline (18 April 2016) with the consequence that some aspects of the directive were directly applicable from April 2016 until the new Finnish legislation was in place from 1 January 2017.

Hansel Ltd. is a state-owned central purchasing body established by the Act on a Limited Liability Company Called Hansel Oy, which operates framework agreements and supports central government departments in Finland with public procurement tasks.

France 
In France, the Department of Legal Affairs (DAJ) of the Ministry for the Economy and Finance (French: Ministère de l'Économie et des Finances) is responsible for establishing regulations regarding public procurement (la commande publique). All currently relevant EU directives have been implemented into national law.

The Union des Groupements d'Achat Public (UGAP), based in Champs-sur-Marne east of Paris, operates as the only general public procurement agency in France.

Article III of Decree 2016-247 of 3 March 2016 provides that the Direction des Achats de l’Etat (DAE: State Purchasing Directorate) has "exclusive competence in matters regarding the strategy for professionalisation of public procurement".

Germany 
In Germany, the Federal Ministry for Economic Affairs and Energy (German: Bundesministerium für Wirtschaft und Energie, abbreviated BMWi) is responsible for defining laws and principles regarding public procurement. In 2016 Germany transposed the new EU Directives of 2014 into domestic law. Thereby, processes and contracts in public procurement have become easier and more flexible. The Act against Restraints of Competition – Part IV (German: Gesetz gegen Wettbewerbsbeschränkungen, abbreviated GWB) and the Ordinance on the Award of Public Contracts (German: Verordnung über die Vergabe öffentlicher Aufträge, abbreviated VgV) regulate procurement above EU thresholds. Detailed procedures are specified in further regulations, e.g. the Procurement Regulation for Public Works (German abbreviation: VOB), the Procurement Regulation for Public Supplies and Services (VOL), and the Procurement Regulation for Professional Services (VOF). For many contracts electronic procurement is made possible via an online platform.

For public procurement below the EU thresholds there are different regulations. At the federal level national budgetary law applies while the 16 federal German states and some municipalities have their own public procurement laws and regulations. This decentralized system reflects the political decentralization in Germany. However, sub-national level procurement regulations often take national regulations as examples and also ensure competition, non-discrimination, and transparency.

Gibraltar
Government procurement in Gibraltar is managed by the Procurement Office, an independent office of Her Majesty's Government of Gibraltar which reports directly to the Financial Secretary. In 2012 the European Commission raised a concern regarding the United Kingdom's incomplete transposition of the Defence and Security Public Contracts Regulations 2011 into law.

Greece
Law 4412/2016 on public procurement and Law 4413/2016 on concessions are the main instruments of Greek legislation governing public procurement. These two laws of 2016, along with earlier reforms introduced under Law 4281/2014 on public procurement law, have radically simplified the previously complex legal regime, repealing numerous previous laws. The European Commission's profile for Greece in its study of administrative capacity in the EU had described the public procurement system in the country as "singularly complex, ... being dispersed among as many as 400 laws, regulations, and presidential decrees". Public contract notices are published in the Central Electronic Registry for Public Procurement (KIMDIS).

The Public Procurement Monitoring Unit (PPMU), established in 1997, part of the Centre of International and European Economic Law in Thessaloniki, provides Greek contracting authorities with "specialised and prompt legal advisory support on awarding public works and technical services contracts falling within the scope of EU Law on Public Procurement".

Hungary
The Hungarian Public Procurement Authority was established by Act XL of 1995 and the current Public Procurement Act (Act CXLIII of 2015) entered into force on 1 November 2015, implementing the 2014 EU procurement directives. The objectives of the 2015 legislation are:
to secure transparency and public control of the effective use of public funds;
to establish conditions of fair competition in public procurement;
to enhance the access of local small and medium-sized enterprises to procurement procedures; and
to promote environmental protection and the social considerations of the State.
Concession award procedures are also covered within the same legislation, and the fundamental principles set out in Act V of 2013 on the Civil Code, the "ultimate instrument relating to the operation of civil persons and economic organizations", also apply to public procurement.

Ireland
Government procurement in Ireland is governed by the European Communities (Award of Public Authorities' Contracts) Regulations 2006 and the European Communities (Public Authorities' Contracts) (Review Procedures) Regulations 2010. , the Minister for Public Expenditure, National Development Plan Delivery and Reform with special responsibility for Public Procurement is Ossian Smyth.

Italy 
Public procurement in Italy is primarily regulated by the Public Contracts Code (Codice dei contratti pubblici), established under the legislative decree of 12 April 2006, which is administered by the Ministry of Infrastructure and Transport (Italian: Ministero delle infrastrutture e dei trasporti). The code was reformed in 2016 to implement the new EU directives of 2014 into domestic Italian law. In addition to the code, guidelines from the National Anti-Corruption Authority (Italian: Autorità Nazionale AntiCorruzione, abbreviated ANAC) and decrees from various ministries also apply to public procurement. Most public procurement on a national level is administered by the state-owned company Consip S.p.A. Larger regions have their own agencies for public purchasing.

The Autorità per la vigilanza sui lavori pubblici (1994-2006) and Autorità per la vigilanza sui contratti pubblici di lavori, servizi e forniture (AVCP) (2006-2014) acted as supervisory authorities overseeing public works procurement, and later covering public procurement more generally. In 2014 this function was transferred to ANAC.

The five regions with special autonomy (Friuli-Venezia Giulia, Sardinia, Sicily, Trentino-Alto Adige and Valle d'Aosta) can also establish regional legislation regarding public procurement.

In case C-3/88, Commission v Italian Republic, the European Court of Justice ruled that arrangements made by the Italian government to restrict contracts for the provision of services to develop data processing systems for Italian public authorities to companies "in which all or a majority of the shares [were] directly or indirectly in public or State ownership", and to include the supply of computing equipment within the services contract, the government had failed to comply with its obligations under Council Directive 77/62/EEC of 21 December 1976 coordinating procedures for the award of public supply contracts, and failed to comply with the principles of freedom of establishment and freedom to provide services in the EEC Treaty.

Latvia
Government procurement in Latvia is regulated by the Public Procurement Law, effective 1 March 2017, and the Law on the Procurement of Public Service Providers, which came into effect on 1 April 2017. These laws transpose the EU procurement directives; one additional legal provision is that for supplier selection purposes, real estate tax debts are checked where tenderers are registered or permanently resident in Latvia. Public procurement opportunities are advertised on the Latvian Elektronisko Iepirkumu Sistēma (EIS) website.

The Procurement Monitoring Office within the Ministry of Finance oversees public procurement. A deposit for filing a review application with the Procurement Monitoring Office must be paid, calculated as 0.5% of the estimated contract value, but no more than €15,000 for construction work contracts or €840 for supply and public service contracts.

Lithuania
Public procurement in the Republic of Lithuania is overseen by the Public Procurement Office, based in Vilnius, under its Director, Diana Vilytė.

Luxembourg
In Luxembourg, the main policy body for public procurement is the Public Procurement Directorate within the Public Works Department of the
Ministry of Sustainable Development and Infrastructure (MDDI). This department is responsible for the regulatory framework, drafting relevant
legislation and monitoring its implementation, and also for representing the Luxemburgish authorities in the field of public procurement. A Tender Commission with members drawn from contracting authorities, chambers of commerce and small business sectors undertakes a consultative role in relation to public procurement.

The EU 2014 Directives on public procurement and utilities procurement were implemented by the Law of 8 April 2018 on public procurement, which was published in the Luxembourg official Gazette (Mémorial: Journal officiel du Grand-Duché de Luxembourg) on 16 April 2018 and entered into force on 20 April 2018. Procurement in the defence and security sector is covered by the Law of 26 December 2012.

Malta
The EU Directive on public procurement is transposed into Maltese law by the Public Procurement Regulations, S.L.174.04, 28 October 2016. These regulations also create the Office of the Director of Contracts (Regulation 10), who is responsible generally for the regulation and administration of public procurement procedures in Malta, a General Contracts Committee, whose members are appointed by the Prime Minister (Regulation 64), a Departmental Contracts Committee for each contracting authority, and in each Ministry a Ministerial Procurement Unit (Regulation 79). Under regulation 80 a Public Contracts Review Board is established. The Commercial Sanctions Tribunal (Regulation 95) is appointed to hear and determine issues relating to the black listing of persons unsuitable for the award of a public contract or to act as a sub-contractor to a public sector contractor.

Netherlands
The main legislative provisions governing public procurement in the Netherlands are:
the Public Procurement Act 2012 as amended on 1 July 2016;
the Public Procurement Decree;
the Works Procurement Regulations 2016;
the Procurement Regulations for the Utilities Sectors 2013;
the Proportionality Guide, 2016;
the Defence and Security Procurement Act 2013.
Sector-specific procurement regulations are also included in the Passenger Transport Act 2000. The Ministry of Economic Affairs is responsible for procurement policy.

TenderNed is the Dutch government's online tendering system, which all Dutch contracting authorities are obliged to use to publish their national and European tenders.

Poland

Portugal
Public procurement in Portugal is governed by the Código dos Contratos Públicos or Public Contracts Code (PCC), which has been implemented through the following Decretos-Leis (decree-laws) and other legislation:
Decree-Law 18/2008 (29 January 2008)
Decree-Law 59/2008 (11 September 2008)
Decree-Law 223/2009 (11 September 2009)
Decree-Law 278/2009 (20 October 2009)
Decree-Law 3/2010 (27 April 2010)
Decree-Law 131/2010 (14 December 2010)
Law 64-B/2011 (30 December 2012)
Decree-Law 149/2012 (12 July 2012)
Decree-Law 214-G/2015 (2 October 2015)
Decree-Law 111-B/2017 (31 August 2017)

Decree-Law No. 104/2011 (6 October 2011) applies to defence contracts.

The Administrative Procedural Code, established under decree-law 4/2015 (7 January 2015) also provides for general procedures on administrative matters and the Procedural Code of the Administrative Courts established by Law no. 15/2002 (22 February 2002), amended by Decree-Law 214-G/2015, stipulates procedures for litigation regarding public contracts and procurement practices.

Slovakia
Public procurement in Slovakia is subject to the Law on Public Contracts, which came into effect in September 2015. Contract opportunities are advertised in the Slovak Official Journal for Procurement Notices and a public register of final beneficiaries of companies that win public sector contracts is maintained. The Public Procurement Regulatory Authority oversees procurement operations.

Slovenia
Public procurement in Slovenia is overseen by the Public Procurement Directorate within the Ministry of Public Administration. The Slovenian Public Procurement Act, the ZJN-3, came into force on 1 April 2016, and covers both public sector and utilities procurement, implementing Directives 2014/24/EU and 2014/25/EU in one piece of legislation.

Spain
Spanish Law 30/2007 on public sector contracts (known as the "LCSP") was substantially amended by a new Law 2/2011 on Sustainable Economy ("LES") following an infringement procedure undertaken by the European Commission, which found that the LCSP "gave contracting authorities a wide, almost unlimited, power to modify essential terms of public contracts after award, in a manner which was not in line with the principles of equal treatment between bidders, non-discrimination and transparency set out in EU public procurement rules".

Sweden
The Swedish Competition Authority is responsible for oversight of government procurement in Sweden, having taken over this role from the Board for Public Procurement when it was dissolved in 2007.

Fiji
The Fiji Procurement Office was established under Section 4 of the Fiji Procurement Regulations 2010 and commenced operations on 1 August 2010. The establishment of the Office and the new Fiji Procurement Regulations were a direct result of the re-organisation of the Government Supplies Department by the Fijian government. The main functions of the Fiji Procurement Office are to regulate and administer the procurement of goods, service and works for the government. The Government Tender Board is "constituted with authority to approve all procurement of goods, services and works valued at FJ$50,001 and more". Refer www.fpo.gov.fj for more information

Ghana

Public procurement in Ghana is undertaken and overseen by the Public Procurement Authority of Ghana. The Public Procurement Board is the central body for policy formulation on procurement. The existing Public Procurement Act 2003 (Act 663) was amended by the Public Procurement (Amendment) Act 2016 (Act 914), which came into effect on 1 July 2016.

The Minister of State in Charge of Public Procurement is Sarah Adwoa Safo. She has taken a lead role in the fight against corruption in Ghana, identifying corruption as "a high-risk activity in the country".

Guernsey
Public procurement opportunities in Guernsey are advertised on the Channel Islands Procurement Portal, which was launched in April 2008 and is shared with Jersey.

Guyana
Public procurement in Guyana is overseen by the Public Procurement Commission, appointed under the Public Procurement Commission Act 2003. Due to lengthy delay in identifying and agreeing commission members, the commission was not appointed until 2016. The PPC is based in the Queenstown area of Georgetown. The National Procurement and Tender Administration of Guyana (NPTA), established under section 16(1) of the Procurement Act 2003, undertakes administrative processes for high value governmental tenders.

Haiti
In 2005, the Haitian government formed the National Commission for Public Procurement (CNMP), based in Port-au-Prince, whose tasks are to ensure that competitive bidding takes place for public contracts and to promulgate effective procurement controls in government administration. The commission was established by the Decree of 3 December 2004. The CNMP publishes lists of awarded public contracts. According to the website GlobalSecurity.org, "despite the CNMP's efforts, major public procurement contracts, notably those involving the state electric company EDH, are routinely awarded in a non-competitive fashion", providing significant opportunities for corruption.

Honduras
Government procurement in Honduras is overseen by the National Office of Contracting and Procurement of the State of Honduras (Oficina Normativa de Contratación y Adquisiciones del Estado, ONCAE), based in Tegucigalpa.

Honduras has five laws directing public contracting:
Ley de Contratación del Estado (revised December 2016)
Ley de Compras Efficientes y Transparentes a través de Medios Electrónicos, Decreto No. 36-2013, 1 July 2014
Reglamento de la Ley de Compras Efficientes y Transparentes a través de Medios Electrónicos, whose purpose is to "develop" the law in decree 36-2013
Reglamento Ley de Contratación del Estado (revised December 2015)
Reforma al Reglamento de la Ley de Contratación del Estado.

Iceland
Act No. 84/2007 on Public Procurement (2007) has three objectives:
to ensure the equal treatment of companies during public procurement
to encourage efficiency in public operations through active competition and
to promote innovation and development in the public procurement of goods, labour and services. The law applies to "the Icelandic State, local authorities, their institutions and other public entities" and to "associations formed by one or more of such authorities". An independent Public Procurement Complaints Commission has power to investigate complaints and may declare a contract "ineffective" if its award was not compliant with the legislation.

India

The government procurement related disciplines in India are governed by Public Procurement Order & General Financial Rule. Public Procurement Orders  & General Financial Rule are primarily been taken care by Public Procurement Section of Department for Promotion of Industry and Internal Trade (DPIIT), Ministry of Commerce and Industry (India) and Department of Expenditure, Ministry of Finance respectively.
In 2017 Public Procurement Order & General Financial Rule was amended by government of India in 2017 to include the preference to Make In India.

Indonesia
Indonesia has observer status with respect to the Government Procurement Agreement. The UK's Serious Fraud Office and other regulatory bodies undertook an enquiry into bribery payments intended to secure contracts with the government of Indonesia for the supply of tetraethyl lead, leading to the conviction of four company executives in 2014. The convictions also related to offences concerning Iraq.

Isle of Man
The Isle of Man government spends over £200 million each year on goods, works and services per year, promoting competition in procurement under the Council of Ministers' Procurement Policy for Government, published in 2017.

Israel
In Israel, the Mandatory Tenders Law of 12 March 1992, 5752–1992 (as amended), governs government procurement procedures. Oversight of the legislation lies with the Ministry of Finance in conjunction with the Knesset Constitution, Law and Justice Committee. The government may, with the approval of the Knesset Foreign Affairs and Defense Committee, direct that a state or a government corporation may not enter into a contract with a particular foreign country or with a particular foreign supplier for reasons of foreign policy.

Jamaica
The Government of Jamaica Procurement Guidelines apply to government procurement in Jamaica, and the Public Sector Procurement Policy of November 2010 reflects "the government's ... strategy to further reform the public procurement system that is aligned to international best practices and promote fair competition for government contracts".

Until 1996, Jamaica operated a centralised procurement system coordinated by the Central Supply Division of the Ministry of Finance, and procurement activity was regulated by the Financial Administration (Supplies) Regulations 1963 supplemented by directives from the Ministry of Finance. The Ministry of Finance and the Public Service is now responsible for oversight of procurement policy. A Procurement Policy Implementation Unit was established within the Ministry of Finance in September 1999.

The Office of the Contractor-General (OCG), based in Kingston, was established in 1983 under the Contractor General Act of that year. The Contractor General is appointed by the Governor General. In December 2008, three members of the procurement committee of the Jamaica Urban Transit Company resigned following reports of procurement breaches identified by the Contractor-General, Greg Christie.

The National Contracts Commission (NCC) was established in October 1999. Members of the NCC are also appointed by the Governor-General.

Jersey
The States of Jersey's procurement opportunities are advertised on the Channel Islands Procurement Portal, which was launched in April 2008 and is shared with Guernsey.

Kenya

Public procurement in Kenya is governed by the Public Procurement and Asset Disposal Act 2015.

Kosovo
 The Republic of Kosovo's Public Procurement Regulatory Commission, based in Pristina, is responsible for "the overall development, operation and supervision of the public procurement system in Kosova", subject to regulations imposed by Public Procurement Law of Kosovo No.04/L-042 of 2011. Law No.04/L-042 was approved by the Assembly of Kosovo on 29 August 2011, promulgated by the President of the Republic of Kosovo with decree No.DL-032-2011 on 31 August 2011, and published in the official Gazette of the Republic of Kosovo No.18 on 18 September 2011. The amended Public Procurement Law (2017) gives preference to local bidders when the quality and price are comparable to that of foreign bidders.

Kosovo is not a WTO member and is therefore not a signatory to the Government Procurement Agreement.

The Kosovo Specialist Chambers and Specialist Prosecutor's Office issues public calls for tender on its own website.

Kyrgyz Republic
Public sector procurement in the Kyrgyz Republic is regulated by the Law "On Public Procurements" dated 3 April 2015, No. 72; the republic refers to the principles of publicity, openness, legality, and impartiality as critical in relation to suppliers (contractors).

Laos
Public procurement in the Lao People's Democratic Republic is governed by the Prime Minister's Decree on Procurement of Goods, Works, Maintenance and Services No. 03/PM, dated 9 January 2004, and the Implementing Rules and Regulations on Government Procurement of Goods, Works, Maintenance and Services No. 063/PM, dated 12 March 2004. Amendments were made to some of the articles of the Implementing Rules and the Decree by Update 0861/MOF of 5 May 2009. Procurement activities are overseen by the Procurement Monitoring Office (PrMO) within the Ministry of Finance.

Liberia
Government procurement in Liberia is governed by the Public Procurement Act. The Public Procurement and Concessions Commission (PPCC) was established in 2005 to "regulate all forms of Public Procurement and Concessions and provide for institutional structures for public procurement and concessions". The PPCC operates an online Vendors' Register.

Procurement is decentralised, but the Ministry of Finance is required "to take part in the negotiations and signing of contracts over US$250,000" and such contracts must "be attested to by the Ministry of Justice".

Liechtenstein
Liechtenstein is a member of the European Economic Area (EEA) and subject to Annex XVI (Procurement) to the EEA Agreement. The Annex provides that its  references to ILO Conventions do not apply to Liechtenstein, but equivalent standards on labour conditions are to be applied.

Maldives
Government procurement in the Maldives is subject to the Public Finance Law (Law No. 3/2006) and chapter 10 of the Public Finance Regulation. The approval of the National Tender Board is required before contracts in excess of MVR 2.5m can be awarded.

Mali
Public procurement in Mali is overseen by the Autorité de Régulation des Marchés Publics et des Délégations de Service Public, based in Bamako.

Mexico
Public procurement is included in Article 134 of the Mexican Constitution. Article 134 is implemented by the Law of Public Sector Acquisitions, Leasing and Services ("Acquisition Law") and the Law of Public Works and Related Services ("Public Work Law"). At a local level, each of the 31 states and the Federal District has different public procurement laws.

Moldova
The Republic of Moldova ratified the Government Procurement Agreement on 14 June 2016.

Montenegro
Montenegro joined the Agreement on Government Procurement in 2015 after approval was granted on 29 October 2014. Exclusions apply in respect of 
procurement of agricultural products for agricultural support programmes and human food aid programmes
procurement of broadcasting material by broadcasters, and contracts for broadcasting time, and
some aspects of procurement connected with the provision of drinking water, energy, transport and the postal sector.

Morocco
Morocco's National Commission for Public Procurement (CNCP) was established "to oversee public procurement, control public spending and guarantee the principles of transparency and parity in the development and execution of contracts between competitors", with a role also in handling complaints regarding procurement actions.

Mozambique
Decree no. 5/2016, Public Procurement Regulations governs public procurement in Mozambique.

New Zealand
The New Zealand Government Procurement Branch of the Ministry of Business, Innovation and Employment is responsible for the Government Procurement Rules, Government Rules of Sourcing and Principles of Government Procurement. The aim of the Government Rules of Sourcing is to "support good practice for procurement planning, approaching the supplier community and contracting". The 66 rules were initially introduced in 2013. The principles apply to all governmental procurement activity but the rules only apply to projects or purchases exceeding $100,000 or construction projects valued over $10 million.

Purchasers of certain common goods or services are required to use "All-of-Government contracts" (AoG) established by the Government Procurement Branch, overseen by the Procurement Functional Leader and managed by appointed procurement Centres of Expertise. Where a public agency wishes to opt out of the use of an AoG contract it must obtain the approval of approval the Procurement Functional Leader: if the agency and the Procurement Functional Leader fail to agree on an opt-out, the State Services Commissioner will decide.

New Zealand joined the Agreement on Government Procurement in 2015 after approval was granted on 29 October 2014.

The second International Civil Service Effectiveness Index, published in April 2019 by the Blavatnik School of Government at the University of Oxford, ranked New Zealand as the top country for Government Procurement Effectiveness. The procurement indicator was a new addition to this index, not present in the previous 2017 index. The indicator covered both procurement systems and procurement practices. The report authors identified that New Zealand's excellence lay in "the extent of e-procurement functions within its overall procurement system; the role of its central purchasing body; and the extent to which policies are in place to enable small and medium-sized enterprises (SME) to take part in central government procurement".

Nigeria
Nigeria is a federal republic comprising 36 states and the Federal Capital Territory. See Rivers State Bureau on Public Procurement as an example of a regulatory body in one of the states.

Pakistan
Government procurement in Pakistan is overseen by the Public Procurement Regulatory Authority (PPRA), an autonomous body based in Islamabad which was established by the Public Procurement Regulatory Authority Ordinance of May 2002. The PPRA is responsible for issuing regulations and procedures for public procurement undertaken by federal level public sector organisations. Its brief is to improve the governance, management, transparency, accountability and quality of Pakistan's public procurement. The PPRA also monitors other public sector agencies' procurement activity. The PPRA Board consists of six ministerial appointments from central government departments, three private members and the Authority's managing director.

Pakistan has observer status with respect to the Government Procurement Agreement.

Peru
Peruvian public procurement law was formerly set out in the Government Procurement Act (approved by Legislative Decree No. 1017) and the Regulation of the Government Procurement Act (approved by Supreme Decree No. 184-2008-EF), which were replaced by a new Government Procurement Act (Law N° 30225) in 2014. Peruvian President Pedro Pablo Kuczynski resigned on 21 March 2018 following allegations that public works contracts had been corruptly awarded to Brazilian conglomerate Odebrecht.

Philippines 
Public sector procurement in the Philippines is required to follow the Government Procurement Reform Act of 2003.

The Philippines government requested observer status with respect to the Government Procurement Agreement on 6 May 2019 and its request was accepted by the WTO Committee on Government Procurement on 26 June 2019, the Philippines confirming that "its government was ... taking steps to create a transparent, open and fair procurement system, founded on a sound legal framework, which includes initiatives to open procurement to foreign suppliers".

Russia

Russian Federal Law N44-ФЗ of 5 April 2013 requires all federal, regional and municipal government customers to publish all information about government tenders, auctions and other purchase procedures on special public government websites.

Rwanda
In Rwanda, the public procurement process is managed on a daily basis by an autonomous organ, the Rwanda Public Procurement Authority (RPPA), which operates under the Ministry of Finance and Economic Planning (MINECOFIN). Public procurement is regulated by the Law N°12/2007 of 27 March 2007 on public procurement which was modified and complemented by the Law N°05/2013 of 13 February 2013. The law is implemented by a Ministerial Order N°001/14/10/TC of 19 February 2014 establishing Regulations on Public Procurement, Standard Bidding Documents and Standard Contracts.

Rwanda has a decentralized public procurement system whereby procuring entities (central government organs, local government entities, government projects, commissions, public institutions, parastatals, agencies or any other government entity charged by the Chief Budget Manager to manage public funds) have the power to conduct directly their public procurement process. The main mission of RPPA is (1) to process the establishment and improvement of public procurement legal framework, (2) provide public procurement legal advisory services, (3) conduct audit and monitoring of public procurement activities carried out by procuring entities (tender award and contract management) and (4) build the capacity of public officials involved in public procurement activities.

The public procurement system in Rwanda is governed by 6 fundamental principles namely (1) transparency, (2) competition,(3) economy, (4) efficiency, (5) fairness and (6) accountability. In the national system, bidders have the right to appeal against public procurement procedures they may think were not conducted appropriately. In that connection, the legal framework provides for the Independent Review Panels at National Level (National Independent Review Panel) and at District Level (Independent Review Panel at District Level). The Independent Review Panels are composed of members from the Private Sector, Civil Society and the Public Sector, and the members from the Public Sector cannot form the majority of members of the Panel. The Independent Review Panel at National Level is under the supervision of the Minister of Finance and Economic Planning whereas the Independent Review Panel at District Level is under the supervision of the District Council.

In order to make the procurement sector a profession in Rwanda, there is an Association of Procurement Professionals which was established by the Law N°011/2016 of 2 May 2016.

Rwanda introduced an e-procurement system in 2016. For more information about Rwanda's e-procurement system please visit www.umucyo.gov.rw; for more information about public procurement in Rwanda in general, please visit www.rppa.gov.rw.

Serbia
The current Serbian Law on Public Procurement came into effect on 1 April 2013, replacing the previous legislation enacted in 2008. A particular concern for Serbia's legislators was dealing with corruption in government procurement: the Law requires Serbia's Public Procurement Office, which oversees procurement, to draft a plan for combating corruption in public procurement procedures, and contracting authorities with an estimated annual value of public procurement in excess of one billion dinars (8.9m Euros) to adopt an internal plan for preventing corruption. The Public Procurement Office is based in Belgrade. The role of the Republic Commission for the Protection of Rights in Public Procurement Procedures, established in 2002, is to protect the rights of bidders during procurement exercises.

The Regulation on Mandatory Elements of Tender Documents in Public Procurement Procedures and Way to Prove Fulfilment of Requirements prescribes a model contract as a mandatory element of every set of tender documents, except when a negotiated procedure is being conducted or where a loan is being procured as a financial service.

In 2016, the EU funded a programme of support for "further improvement of Public Procurement system in Serbia", as part of the EU's pre-accession assistance programme. There is no current target date for Serbia to join the EU.

Singapore

Singapore's Ministry of Finance is responsible for the Government Procurement policy framework, which governs how government agencies undertake their procurement.

In 2014, the Public Accounts Committee of the Parliament of Singapore criticised the state of government procurement in Singapore, identifying a number of irregularities in procurement procedures including:
weak rationales invoked when waiving competitive processes;
allowing some bidders to amend their tenders after tenders had closed;
not disclosing evaluation criteria to bidders within tender documentation;
improper procedures for tender evaluation;
lax oversight and monitoring of outsourced projects.

GeBIZ is a Government-to-business (G2B) Public eProcurement business centre where suppliers can conduct electronic commerce with the Singaporean Government. All of the public sector's invitations for quotations and tenders (except for security-sensitive contracts) are posted on GeBIZ. Suppliers can search for government procurement opportunities, retrieve relevant procurement documentations and submit their bids online.

South Africa
Section 217 of the Constitution of the Republic of South Africa, 1996 (Act 108 of 1996) provides the basis for government procurement:
(1) When an organ of state in the national, provincial or local sphere of Government, or any other institution identified in national legislation, contracts for goods or services, it must do so in accordance with a system which is fair, equitable, transparent, competitive and cost effective.
(2) Subsection (1) does not prevent the organs of state or institutions referred to in that subsection from implementing a procurement policy providing for – 
(a) categories of preference in the allocation of contracts; and 
(b) the protection or advancement of persons, or categories of persons, disadvantaged by unfair discrimination. 
(3) National legislation must prescribe a framework within which the policy referred to in subsection (2) must be implemented.

In Subsection (3), the previous words "may be implemented" were amended to "must be implemented" by section 6 of the Constitution Seventh Amendment Act of 2001.

The Public Finance Management Act 1999 also refers to the duty of the Accounting Officer of a department to have and to maintain an appropriate procurement and supply system which is "fair, equitable, transparent, competitive and cost effective".

To help prevent corruption, a Central Tender Board was established in 2014.

Suriname
Government procurement in Suriname takes place on the basis of open tenders. Participants in a tendering procedure must hold a valid business license and must be registered with the Suriname Chamber of Commerce and Industry (KKF). Suriname is not a signatory to the WTO Government Procurement Agreement.

Tajikistan
Tajikistan is not a signatory to the WTO Government Procurement Agreement, but the US Department of State has noted that the country has made a commitment to initiate accession to the agreement as part of its WTO accession protocol.

Tanzania
Public procurement in the United Republic of Tanzania is overseen by the country's Public Procurement Regulatory Authority (PPRA), which was established under the terms of the Public Procurement Act in 2004. The objectives of the PPRA areThe Public Procurement Act 2004 has been superseded by the Public Procurement Act 2011.

Ukraine
The Ministry of Economic Development and Trade (Ukraine) is an executive authority in charge of coordination of procurement of goods, works and services for public funds. The Law "On public procurement" is one of the core legislative bases of the procurement regulations. It made electronic public procurement procedures and use of e-procurement system Prozorro mandatory for all procuring entities after August 2016.

Ukraine joined the Government Procurement Agreement in March 2016.

United Arab Emirates
Federal government procurement within the United Arab Emirates is governed by Cabinet Resolution No. 32 of 2014 on Federal Government Procurement Regulation and Storehouse Management in Federal Government, which applies to all supply, works and services purchasing undertaken by the federal government and the federal ministries and governmental agencies (except the Ministry of Defence), and also to independent federal entities such as the General Authority for Civil Aviation, Emirates Real Estate Corporation, FEWA, ESCA, Insurance Authority, Emirates Post Group Holding, National Transport Authority, Telecommunications Regulatory Authority, UAE University and Zayed University. UAE Federal Decree No. 12 of the Deputy Supreme Commander of the Armed Forces (1986) applies to armed forces procurement.

Conditional preferential treatment is afforded under Resolution 32 to corporate suppliers whose capital does not exceed AED 10 million and in which the UAE national shareholding is not less than 51%, and to facilities which are financed by SMEs-supporting funds and governed by federal or local law.

United Kingdom

At around £290 billion every year, public sector procurement accounts for around a third of all public expenditure in the UK. EU-based laws continue to apply to government procurement, where procurement is governed by the Public Contracts Regulations 2015, Part 3 of the Small Business, Enterprise and Employment Act 2015, and (in Scotland) the Public Contracts (Scotland) Regulations of 2015  and 2016.

United States

Government procurement by public authorities in the United States accounts for about US$7 trillion annually; the central purchasing agency is the General Services Administration (GSA). Federal procurement is governed by the Federal Acquisition Regulation. FedBizOpps and USASpending.gov are websites where federal contracts are shown. Public announcements of awards has several exemptions, including contracts less than $3.5 million. Historically, the procurement data has been criticized for deficiencies leading to a number of reforms. In 2013, eight legacy databases were merged into a single system called "System for Award Management" (SAM), where companies interested in doing business with the federal government may register their interest.

Contracts are not posted online, although two agencies have explored the possibility.

In January 2014, the Office of Inspector General at NASA released a report criticizing the agency's lack of strategic sourcing. Because IT departments were spending autonomously, NASA spent $25.7 million on similar purchases.

The National Institute of Governmental Purchasing and the Federal Acquisition Institute are active in procurement certification and training. A specialized program in procurement law in the United States is located at The George Washington University Law School.

Vatican City
Purchasing is overseen by the Secretariat for the Economy, which is responsible for setting purchasing policies and procedures, while responsibility for expenditure is devolved to individual dicasteries and administrations.

Zambia
Public procurement in Zambia is governed by the Public Procurement Act No. 12 of 2008 and the Public Procurement Regulations of 2011. Prior to 2008, public procurement was governed by the Zambia National Tender Board Act, Act No. 30 of 1982. The CEO of the 
Zambia National Tender Board is appointed by the President.

Zimbabwe
The Government of Zimbabwe established a public procurement law in 1999.

The 2013-2018 Zim-ASSET Strategy (Zimbabwe Agenda for Sustainable Socio-Economic Transformation) referred to plans to "overhaul the State Procurement Board" with "immediate effect" (2013). The Zim-ASSET Strategy aimed to achieve "sustainable development and social equity anchored on indigenization, empowerment and employment creation" for the benefit of "indigenous Zimbabweans and not foreign investors", objectives which have been linked with those of ZANU's Mgagao Declaration of 1976.

The Public Procurement and Disposal of Public Assets Act, 2017 repealed the Procurement Act of 1999 and abolished the State Procurement Board.  On 9 January 2018, President Emmerson Mnangagwa appointed an eight-member Procurement Regulatory Authority of Zimbabwe which replaced the Board. The legislation incorporates a "domestic preference" section empowering procuring entities to "give preference to bids from Zimbabwean or local suppliers and manufacturers", and provides for a Special Procurement Oversight Committee to be established to oversee "certain especially sensitive or especially valuable contracts".

Nyasha Chizu, CEO of the Procurement Regulatory Authority of Zimbabwe, played a key role as technical advisor on public procurement reform.

See also
Government spending
Best value procurement
Contract awarding
Forward Commitment Procurement
Open Contracting Data Standard
Public eProcurement
Standstill period
Public–private partnership
Business-to-government

References

Further reading
 Decio Coviello & Stefano Gagliarducci (2017). Tenure in Office and Public Procurement. American Economic Journal: Economic Policy 9, no. 3: 59–105.
 Decio Coviello & Andrea Guglielmo & Giancarlo Spagnolo (2018). The Effect of Discretion on Procurement Performance. Management Science 64, no. 2: 715–38.
 Francesco Decarolis (2014). Awarding Price, Contract Performance, and Bids Screening: Evidence from Procurement Auctions. American Economic Journal: Applied Economics 6, no. 1: 108–32.
 Francesco Decarolis & Giuliana Palumbo (2015). Renegotiation of Public Contracts: An Empirical Analysis. Economics Letters 132, no. C: 77–81.
 Francesco Decarolis & Leonardo M. Giuffrida & Elisabetta Iossa & Vincenzo Mollisi & and Giancarlo Spagnolo (2019). Bureaucratic Competence and Procurement Outcomes. NBER Working Paper No. 24201. Cambridge, MA: National Bureau of Economic Research.
 Oliver Hart & John Moore (1988). Incomplete Contracts and Renegotiation. Econometrica 56, no. 4: 755–85.
 Oliver Hart & Andrei Shleifer & Robert W. Vishny (1997). The Proper Scope of Government: Theory and an Application to Prisons. Quarterly Journal of Economics 112, no. 4: 1127–61.
Bosio, E. and Djankov, S., How Large is Public Procurement?, World Bank Blogs, published 5 February 2022

 
Public economics